Safwan al-Qudsi (1940 – 28 October 2022) was the Secretary General of the Syrian Arab Socialist Union Party,  a member of the central leadership of the National Progressive Front, a political alliance of parties which controls the Syrian legislature, and chairman of the Arab Parties Congress.

Safwan al-Qudsi received his bachelor's degree in philosophy from the University of Damascus.  From 1972 to 1974 he was an assistant editor of the magazine Knowledge, a chief editor from 1974 to 1978. From 1980 through 1981 he was editor-in-chief of Moral, a literary magazine.

Safwan al-Qudsi was elected to the legislature in 1977, and was a Minister of State from 1978 to 1980.  Since 1981 he has been a member of the central leadership of the National Progressive Front. He has been the Secretary General of the ASU since 1984. He was member of the Syrian Society for Research and Studies.

In March 2000 Safwan al-Qudsi's wife, Bari'a al-Qudsi, was appointed Minister of Labor and Welfare, representing the ASU party in the cabinet. She lost the position in the December 2001 governmental reshuffle.

Selected publications
Qudsi, Safwan (1974) Siyasah al-musallahah: dirasat fi al-fikr al-siyasi al-muasir (Armed Policy Studies: Contemporary political thinking) Wizarat al-Thaqafaj wa-al-Irshad al-Qawmi, Damascus 
Qudsi, Safwan (1984) al-Batal wa-l-tarikh: Qira'a fi fikr Hafiz al-Asad al-siyasi (The Hero and History: A Reading of the Political Thought of Hafiz al-Asad) Ṭalas, Damascus

Notes

External links
"صفوان قدسي" brief biography of Safwan al-Qudsi in Arabic

1940 births
2022 deaths
Al-Qudsi family
Arab Socialist Union Party (Syria) politicians
Damascus University alumni
Members of the People's Assembly of Syria
Syrian ministers of state